Helen of Croatia may refer to two queens consort of Croatia:
Helen of Zadar
Helen of Hungary